Soul Sounds may refer to:

 Soul Sounds (choir), a choir based in Colombo, Sri Lanka
 Soul Sounds (album), a 1967 album by Chris Clark
 "Soul Sound", a 2001 song by Sugababes